The Savonian dialects (also called Savo Finnish)() are forms of the Finnish language spoken in Savonia and other parts of Eastern Finland. Finnish dialects are grouped broadly into Eastern and Western varieties; Savonian dialects are of the Eastern variety.

Savonian dialects are the most widely distributed Finnish dialect group (setting aside the higher-level east/west split mentioned above). They are spoken in the Savonia region (in both North and South Savo), but also in North Karelia, parts of Päijät-Häme, Central Finland, Kainuu, Koillismaa district of Northern Ostrobothnia, the lake section between Southern and Central Ostrobothnia as far north as Evijärvi and in the municipalities of Pudasjärvi and the Southern part of Ranua in Lapland. Also the language spoken by forest settlers in Värmland and Norwegian Hedmark of Central Scandinavia belonged to the old Savonian dialects. The geographical area the Savonian dialects cover makes up one-third the area of Finland.

History
The Savonian dialects are of different origin than Western Finnish dialects. Savonian dialects form a dialect continuum with other Eastern dialects of Finnish and the Karelian language, with whom they have common ancestry in the Proto-Karelian language spoken in the coast of Lake Ladoga in the Iron Age.

Features
Although the Savonian dialects are spread over a large geographical area with significant variations, they are rather different from the standard language and are recognized as local dialects. There are large variations between different Savonian dialects, but a few of the most stereotypical features are the following.

Phonology

Vowels
Where standard Finnish has a diphthong, Savo may have a narrower diphthong or long vowel. Conversely, where standard Finnish has a long vowel, Savo may have a diphthong.
When standard  occur in an initial syllable (and thus have primary stress), they become opening diphthongs. Thus many Savo speakers have mua for Standard Finnish maa "land, country, ground", and have piä for pää "head".
Word-final  of standard Finnish correspond to Savonian  respectively.
When both would be unstressed, the otherwise bisyllabic combinations of o/ö/e followed by a/ä are produced as monosyllabic long vowels when no consonant intervenes. For instance, Savonian dialects have  for  "brown", and have  for  "plowing (partitive)". (This change is not specific to Savonian dialects and is found in most forms of spoken Finnish today.)
(standard  "old").
The epenthetic vowel is often identical in quality to the preceding vowel. However, if the first of the non-epenthetic vowels is high and the second is low, the epenthetic vowel may be mid (but preserves the roundness specification of the preceding vowel).

Consonants
Savonian dialects have re-developed palatalized consonants (which were lost in Proto-Finnic). The consonants that can be palatalized are those that are coronal: l, n, t, r, s.
Singleton consonants are geminated when they occur after a (primarily or secondarily) stressed short syllable and before a long vowel. Thus  replace standard . This gemination is fed by the process described point 3 of the preceding section: Native Savonians do not say that they speak ; they say that they speak .
In the eastern Savonian dialects, this gemination is more general; it applies to non-singleton consonants (cf. standard ), to consonants that don't ordinarily participate in the consonant gradation process, and after unstressed short vowels (cf. standard }).
The word-final  of standard Finnish corresponds to a variety of consonants in Savo, depending on the environment in which it occurs.
When the next word begins with a vowel, /n/ is replaced with a glottal stop .
Word-final  assimilates to consonants that follow it, yielding a geminate consonant;  contrasts with standard .
All syllable-initial consonants except the last one (which contacts the nucleic vowel) are systematically and completely removed in loanwords, e.g.  (standard ).
 occurs between a long back vowel/diphthong and a short back vowel:  for standard .
 occurs between a long front vowel/diphthong and a short front vowel:  for standard .
If none of the above apply, the weak form may remain as :  for standard .
The  consonant sequences found in standard Finnish (whose weak grade is likewise  in the standard language) are not found in Savonian dialects. Depending on the specific Savonian dialect they use, a Savo speaker may have:
 (weak grade ), thus  instead of standard  "forest, forest's".
 (weak grade ), thus .
 (weak grade ), thus .

Morphology and syntax
The use of the -loi plural suffix is more general than in other dialects, including standard Finnish. For instance risti "cross" has the plural partitive form ristilöitä (standard Finnish: ristejä).

Although standard and known elsewhere, the usage of verb compounds is particularly prevalent in Savo Finnish and a prolific source of creative expressions. The first verb is in the infinitive and indicates the action, and the second verb is inflected and indicates the manner. For example, seistä toljotat "you stand there gawking" consists of words meaning "to-stand you-gawk".

List of dialects

Northern Savonian dialects
Northern Savonian dialects are spoken in the municipalities of Hankasalmi (Eastern part),  Haukivuori, Heinävesi, Iisalmi, Joroinen, Jäppilä, Kaavi, Kangaslampi, Karttula, Keitele, Kiuruvesi, Konnevesi,  (Eastern part), Kuopio, Lapinlahti, Leppävirta, Maaninka, Muuruvesi (part of Juankoski since 1971), Nilsiä, Pieksämäki, Pielavesi, Pyhäsalmi, Rantasalmi, Rautalampi, Riistavesi (part of Kuopio since 1973), Siilinjärvi, Sonkajärvi, Suonenjoki, Säyneinen (part of Juankoski since 1971), Tervo, Tuusniemi, Varpaisjärvi, Varkaus, Vehmersalmi, Vesanto, Vieremä and Virtasalmi.

Southern Savonian dialects
Southern Savonian dialects are spoken in the municipalities of Anttola, Hirvensalmi, Juva, Kangasniemi, Mikkeli, Mäntyharju, Pertunmaa, (Eastern part) Puumala, Ristiina, Sulkava and Suomenniemi.

Middle dialects of Savonlinna area
Middle dialects of Savonlinna area are spoken in the Eastern Savonia, the municipalities surrounding the city of Savonlinna between Southern Savonia and North Karelia: Enonkoski, Kerimäki, Punkaharju, Savonranta and Sääminki (part of Punkaharju and Savonlinna since 1973).

The dialect spoken in Enonkoski has many similarities with the dialects of Northern Savo, while the dialect spoken in the Southern parts of Punkaharju resembles South-Eastern dialects in many ways. The difference between dialects in Savonlinna district has its roots in the colonization history. The area of greater Kerimäki (which consisted Enonkoski, Punkaharju and Savonranta) was settled by Karelian people till the 16th century, but from the 14th century the Savonian has started to settle to the Eastern side of Lake Pihlajavesi and the coasts of Puruvesi.

The differences between natural and governmental borders goes together in many ways. In Enonkoski the dialect is more Savonian in the Northern side of Hanhivirta. The other reason to this is that the Northern villages of Enonkoski belonged to Heinävesi in the 19th century, while the Southern villages were part of Kerimäki. The Northern border of Puruvesi goes through Lake Puruvesi. So the old Karelian-based dialect features have kept in Punkaharju much better than in Kerimäki, which is located in the Northern side of Puruvesi.

Eastern Savonian dialects or the dialects of North Karelia
Eastern Savonian dialects or the dialects of North Karelia are spoken in North Karelia in the municipalities of Eno, Ilomantsi, Joensuu, Juuka, Kesälahti, Kiihtelysvaara (now part of Joensuu), Kitee, Kontiolahti, Korpiselkä (now part of Russia, little part of Tohmajärvi since 1946), Outokumpu, Liperi, Nurmes, Pielisjärvi (part of Lieksa since 1973), Polvijärvi, Pyhäselkä, Pälkjärvi (now part of Russia, little part of Tohmajärvi since 1946), Rautavaara, Ruskeala (now  part of Russia), Soanlahti, Tohmajärvi, Tuupovaara (now part of Joensuu) and Valtimo.

Dialects of Kainuu

Kainuu dialects are spoken in Hyrynsalmi, Kajaani, Kuhmo, Kuusamo, Paltamo, Posio, Pudasjärvi, Puolanka, Ranua (Southern part), Ristijärvi, Sotkamo, Suomussalmi, Taivalkoski and Vaala.

Dialects of Middle Finland
Dialects of Middle Finland are spoken in Hankasalmi (Western part), Karstula, Kinnula, Kivijärvi, Konginkangas (part of Äänekoski since 1993), Konnevesi (Western part), Kyyjärvi, Laukaa, Multia, Pihtipudas, Pylkönmäki, Saarijärvi, Sumiainen, Uurainen, Viitasaari and Äänekoski.

Dialects of Päijät-Häme
Päijät-Häme Savonian dialects are spoken in Joutsa, Jyväskylä, Jämsä, Korpilahti, Koskenpää (part of Jämsänkoski since 1969), Kuhmoinen, Leivonmäki, Luhanka, Muurame, Pertunmaa (Western part), Petäjävesi, Sysmä and Toivakka.

Middle dialects of Keuruu-Evijärvi
Middle dialects of Keuruu-Evijärvi are spoken in Alajärvi, Evijärvi, Keuruu, Lappajärvi, Lehtimäki, Pihlajavesi, Soini, Vimpeli and Ähtäri. This sub-dialect area is wedge shaped in the middle of Ostrobothnia, which has its own dialects and also Swedish-speaking population. This is the influence of Savonian slash-and-burn farmers who colonized the lake section in Southern Ostrobothnia in the 17th century.

Värmland Savonian dialects
The expansion of Savonian slash-and-burn agriculture, which started in the beginning of Modern era, expanded to Central Scandinavia. Mostly in the beginning of the 17th century Savonian settlers, mainly from the parish of Rautalampi, settled in Värmland, Sweden. In the beginning of the 19th century tens of thousands of people spoke the Savonian language as their mother tongue.  These "Forest Finns" were an interesting group from a linguistic point of view because their language was isolated from other influences. The practice of slash and burn agriculture was prohibited in Sweden in the middle of the 17th century and no new Finnish settlers moved to the area. The language of Forest Finns lacked the Schwa vowel and gemination, which are used now in the dialect spoken in Rautalampi. Nowadays the Savonian dialect of Värmland is extinct. The last Savonian speakers were Johannes Johansson-Oinonen (died in 1965) and Karl Persson (died 1969).

Music
The band Verjnuarmu performed melodic death metal in the Savo dialect, while Värttinä performs folk music. The folk song "Ievan polkka" is in the dialect, as well.

Sources
 Suomen murrealueet ('Finnish dialects' – in Finnish)

References

Finnish dialects
Savonia (historical province)